Richard Ernest Myers II (born 1967) is the Chief United States district judge of the United States District Court for the Eastern District of North Carolina. He is a former law professor at the University of North Carolina School of Law.

Early life and education 

Myers was born in Kingston, Jamaica, and moved to Wilmington, North Carolina, as a child. His voter registration states that he belongs to "two or more races." Myers earned his Bachelor of Arts, summa cum laude, and his Master of Arts from the University of North Carolina at Wilmington. He worked as a reporter for the Star-News from 1991 to 1995, where he covered the murder of James R. Jordan Sr., the father of Michael Jordan. In 1998, he received his Juris Doctor, magna cum laude, from the University of North Carolina School of Law, where he served as an Articles Editor on the North Carolina Law Review. He graduated Order of the Coif.

Legal and academic career 

Upon graduation from law school, Myers served as a law clerk to Judge David Sentelle of the United States Court of Appeals for the District of Columbia Circuit. He then worked in private practice at O'Melveny & Myers. He previously served as an Assistant United States Attorney for the Central District of California and later the Eastern District of North Carolina. While a federal prosecutor, Myers prosecuted a wide variety of crimes including counterfeiting, narcotics, and firearms offenses. Myers was the Henry Brandis Distinguished Professor of Law and Director of Trial Advocacy at the University of North Carolina School of Law, where his teaching and scholarship focused on criminal law. He joined UNC as a faculty member in 2004, and left in 2019 upon becoming a judge.

At UNC, Myers served as the advisor to the law school's Federalist Society chapter.

Federal judicial service 

On August 14, 2019, President Donald Trump announced his intent to nominate Myers to serve as a United States district judge for the United States District Court for the Eastern District of North Carolina. On September 9, 2019, his nomination was sent to the Senate. He has been nominated to the seat vacated by Malcolm Jones Howard, who assumed senior status on December 31, 2005. Myers was nominated to a seat which had been vacant since December 31, 2005, making it the longest federal judicial vacancy at the time of Myers' nomination. On September 11, 2019, a hearing on his nomination was held before the Senate Judiciary Committee. On October 31, 2019, his nomination was reported out of committee by a 16–6 vote.  On December 4, 2019, the United States Senate invoked cloture on his nomination by a 72–22 vote. On December 5, 2019, his nomination was confirmed by a 68–21 vote. He received his judicial commission on December 10, 2019. Myers became Chief Judge in January 2021. He maintains chambers in Wilmington.

Memberships 

Myers has been a member of the Federalist Society since 2004. He has been a member of the National Rifle Association since 2010. He has been a member of the Christian Legal Society since 2004, of which he serves as a faculty advisor.

Review of judicial rulings 
In 2022,  Chief Judge Richard Myers concluded that a Civil War amnesty law passed by Congress in 1872 essentially repealed the 14th Amendment's "disqualification clause," which prohibited officeholders from returning to elected positions if they supported an insurrection. Myers agreed that the Amnesty Act of 1872 applied not only retroactively to Confederate officials, but also in perpetuity regarding future rebellions. This interpretation was later rejected by an appeals court, which ruled that this law applied only to people who committed "constitutionally wrongful acts" before 1872.

See also 
 List of African-American federal judges
 List of African-American jurists

References

External links 
 

|-

1967 births
Living people
20th-century American lawyers
21st-century American lawyers
21st-century American judges
African-American lawyers
African-American judges
Assistant United States Attorneys
Federalist Society members
Judges of the United States District Court for the Eastern District of North Carolina
North Carolina lawyers
People associated with O'Melveny & Myers
People from Kingston, Jamaica
United States district court judges appointed by Donald Trump
University of North Carolina at Wilmington alumni
University of North Carolina faculty
University of North Carolina School of Law alumni